Devesil Bight is the 5.8 km wide embayment indenting for 2.2 km the southeast coast of Robert Island in the South Shetland Islands, Antarctica between Kermen Peninsula and the 2.7 km peninsula ending up in Robert Point.  Entered between Edwards Point and Robert Point.  Shape enhanced as a result of glacier retreat in the late 20th and early 21st century.

The feature is named after the settlement of Devesilovo in southern Bulgaria.

Location
Bulgarian mapping in 2009.

Map
 L.L. Ivanov. Antarctica: Livingston Island and Greenwich, Robert, Snow and Smith Islands. Scale 1:120000 topographic map.  Troyan: Manfred Wörner Foundation, 2009.

References
 Bulgarian Antarctic Gazetteer. Antarctic Place-names Commission. (details in Bulgarian, basic data in English)
 SCAR Composite Antarctic Gazetteer.

External links
 Devesil Bight. Copernix satellite image

Landforms of Robert Island
Bays of Antarctica
Bulgaria and the Antarctic